Duaij Naser Abdulla (born January 18, 1983) is a Bahraini footballer currently playing for Al-Hala of Bahrain and the Bahrain national football team.

External links
 

1983 births
Living people
Bahraini footballers
Al-Gharafa SC players
Al-Shamal SC players
Al-Wakrah SC players
Busaiteen Club players
Al-Muharraq SC players
Qatar Stars League players
Bahraini Premier League players
Al Hala SC players
Association football forwards
Bahrain international footballers
2004 AFC Asian Cup players